John Finegan may refer to:

Jack Finegan (1908–2000), biblical scholar
John Finegan, wrestling referee, see List of former Extreme Championship Wrestling personnel

See also
 John Finnegan (disambiguation)